Keith Marsh (1926 – 28 January 2013) was an English actor who appeared in numerous television productions over a 50-year period. Born in Blackpool, Lancashire, he is perhaps best known for playing Jacko in the Thames Television sitcom Love Thy Neighbour (1972–76), who had the catchphrase "I'll have 'arf!"

Roles 
Other TV appearances include Coronation Street, in which he appeared as a foreman (1961), George Chippendale (1966), James Dawson (1972), George Marsden (1980), Harry Ashton (1988) and Uncle Mervin (1999). He also appeared in George and the Dragon, Edna, the Inebriate Woman, Last of the Summer Wine, ‘’Special Branch’' (1974, series4,ep12), and The Bill. In 1985 Marsh appeared in The Beiderbecke Affair as "Harry" (the man with the dog called Jason).

His film work included Quatermass and the Pit (1967), Arthur? Arthur! (1969), Taste the Blood of Dracula (1970), Scrooge (1970), the film version of Love Thy Neighbour (1973), The Human Factor (1979) and the role of Conway in the film Daleks' Invasion Earth 2150 A.D. (1966).

Death
Marsh died in January 2013, aged 86 of prolonged health conditions.

Filmography

References

External links

1926 births
2013 deaths
Male actors from Lancashire
English male film actors
English male soap opera actors
People from Blackpool
Date of birth missing